Jaruga Hydroelectric Power Plant is a hydroelectric power plant on river Krka, located in Šibenik-Knin County, in central Dalmatia, Croatia.

The first European hydroelectric power plant was built in Croatia (many people worked together to make this possible). It was put into operation two days after, according to Nikola Tesla's patents, the world's first hydroelectric power plant at Niagara Falls was put into operation. A turbine, two generators (42 Hz, 550 kW) and a transformer made by the Hungarian company Ganz were built under the Skradinski Buk waterfall. The Jaruga is one of the oldest power-generating facilities in the world. Its present location dates back to 1903, when it was moved from the nearby original Jaruga power station built in 1895.

History

The oldest Jaruga power plant was the first alternating current (AC) power system in Croatia. It was designed to power the street lights in Šibenik, making it the first city in the world with street lights powered by a polyphase system of alternating current (AC).

In 1893, Šibenik mayor Ante Šupuk and Vjekoslav Meichsner started a business and obtained a license to use the waters of river Krka, and in 1894 they obtained permission to set up electrical power lines on municipal property in order to start lighting the streets with electric power. The construction of Jaruga started in 1894 and lasted for 16 months.

The two generators (42 Hz, 550 kW each) and the transformers were produced and installed by the Hungarian company Ganz.
The original Jaruga system supplied 340 street lights and some electrified houses in Šibenik.

Croatian Post printed a stamp commemorating this power plant in 1995. The Croatian national electricity company HEP lists the same event and date as its origin and marks the date.

Three years after the first Jaruga was built, the construction of the second Jaruga hydro power plant began, the current location. It was completed in 1903 when its capacity was 6 MW.

Since its construction, the current Jaruga has been refurbished in 1916, 1937, 1970, 1995 and 2008, but the basic concept of the plant had been maintained. In 1936 a second generator was installed that increased the capacity to 5,6 MW.

Catchment and capacity

The Krka River rises under the travertine barrier of the Topolje waterfall near the town of Knin. Total length of the Krka River, from its spring to its end in the Adriatic sea near Skradin is 56 km. Total Krka catchment area is 2427 km2, of which 142 km2 is included in the Krka National park.

Along its course, the Krka receives a number of important tributaries. Some major among them are Krčić, Kosovčica, Orašnica, Butišnica, Miljacka, Čikola, Goduča and Rivina Jaruga. The Jaruga power plant is the last one of five hydro power plants in the Krka catchment, from its spring to the sea. It uses the gross head of about 26 m, which is a portion of the naturally concentrated head of about 45 m at the Skradinski buk waterfall. Visovačko jezero (lake) is upstream the waterfall and the Krka and Prokljansko jezero (lake), affected by the sea backwaters, downstream.

This is a typical run-off-the-river plant of diversion type, with no possibility of water regulation. Total installed capacity is 5.4 MW and average annual output 35 GWh. It is a minor power plant concerning both capacity and annual output. Also the most important use is to power or give energy to the park.

The Krka River catchment hydroelectric power plants

Golubić Hydroelectric Power Plant
Small Krčić Hydroelectric Power Plant
Miljacka Hydroelectric Power Plant
Roški Slap Hydroelectric Power Plant
Jaruga Hydroelectric Power Plant

See also

Krka
Krka National Park
Hrvatska elektroprivreda

References

External links 

 http://www.ieee.org/web/aboutus/history_center/conferences/che2007/prog_comm.html
 https://web.archive.org/web/20110719133609/http://www.croatia.ch/zanimljivosti/070812.php

Hydroelectric power stations in Croatia
Buildings and structures in Šibenik-Knin County
Energy infrastructure completed in 1895